K. D. Singh Babu Stadium may refer to following stadiums:

 K. D. Singh Babu Stadium, Barabanki
 K. D. Singh Babu Stadium, Lucknow